The United States census of 1800 was the second census conducted in the United States. It was conducted on August 4, 1800. It showed that 5,308,483 people were living in the United States, of whom 893,602 were enslaved. The 1800 census included the new District of Columbia. The census for the following states were lost: Georgia, Kentucky, New Jersey, Tennessee, and Virginia.

Census questions
The 1800 census asks the following information in columns, left to right:

This census is one of the several for which some of the original data are no longer available. Original census returns for Georgia, Kentucky, Mississippi, New Jersey, Tennessee, and Virginia were lost over the years.

Data availability
No microdata from the 1800 population census are available, but aggregate data for small areas, together with compatible cartographic boundary files, can be downloaded from the National Historical Geographic Information System.

State and regional populations

City populations

References

External links
 Historic US Census data
 1800 Census: 1800 United States Census for Genealogy & Family History Research

Census
United States census
United States